North Dakota Highway 42 (ND 42) is a north-south highway located in northwestern North Dakota. The highway traverses northern Williams and Divide Counties. The southern terminus is at ND 50 near Corinth and the northern terminus is a continuation as Saskatchewan Highway 350 (Hwy 350) at the Canadian border.

Route description 
ND 42 begins at a junction with ND 50 near the small town of Corinth, in northern Williams County. After going through town, it enters Divide County, and meets ND 5 in the county seat, Crosby. For , ND 42 runs concurrently with ND 5 from Crosby to just south of Ambrose. ND 42 turns northward to end at the Canadian border.

Major intersections

History 
From 1926 to 1927, ND 42 was previously designated onto an alignment now designated as ND 37.

See also 
List of Canada-United States border crossings

References

External links
North Dakota Highways Page by Chris Geelhart
NDDOT’s Highway Systems Page

042 
042 
042